This is a ranking of Swedish billionaires. The following list is based on the annual estimated wealth and assets assessment compiled and published by American business magazine Forbes. The wealth of 45 people exceeds $ 1 billion.

Methodology
To assess and compile data on estimated wealth and assets, Forbes relies on information gathered by more than 50 reporters working in 16 countries throughout the year. The reporters arrange interviews with the candidates, interview the employees, attorneys, and securities analysts, and keep track of candidates' deals. The net worth is estimated based on individuals' assets, such as stakes in public and private companies, yachts, art, and real estate. Interviews are conducted to vet the figures and improve the estimate of an individual's holdings. Positions in a publicly-traded stock are priced to market on a date roughly a month before publication. For example, the 2022 ranking relies on the stock prices and exchange rates as of March 11, 2022. Privately held companies are priced by the prevailing price-to-sales or price-to-earnings ratios. Known debt is subtracted from assets to get a final estimate of an individual's estimated worth in United States dollars. Since stock prices fluctuate rapidly, an individual's true wealth and ranking at the time of publication may vary from their situation when the list was compiled.

The Forbes policy is not to list multigenerational families who share fortunes. Still, in some cases, it lists couples and/or siblings together if the ownership breakdown among them isn't clear. However, an estimated net worth of $1 billion should be calculated per person. If the wealth could be traced to one living individual, the Forbes includes wealth belonging to a member's immediate relatives. Royal families and dictators that have their wealth contingent on a position are always excluded from the rankings.

2022 list
The forty-five entrepreneurs billionaires are listed as follows, including their Sweden rank (S#) and world rank (W#), citizenship, age, net worth, and source of wealth:

References

Lists of people by wealth
Net worth
 
Economy of Sweden-related lists